Parliamentary elections were held in Colombia on 17 March 1968 to elect the Chamber of Representatives, the last occasion on which mid-term elections were held for the Chamber. Under the National Front agreement, only the Conservative Party and the Liberal Party were able to contest the elections, with 50% of the seats in both houses allocated to each party. As a result, the main contest at the elections was between factions within each party.

Results

References

Parliamentary elections in Colombia
Colombia
1968 in Colombia